Seraphim (Alfred Lade or Karl Georg Albert Lade) (4 June 1883 in Leipzig - 14 September 1950 in Munich) was a metropolitan of the Russian Orthodox Church Outside Russia. During World War II, he supported the invasion of the USSR, but he also saved the life of Alexander (Nyemolovsky), the bishop of Brussels and Belgium, imprisoned by the Gestapo due to his anti-Nazi views.

Bibliography
Сорокалетие служения в священном сане Высокопреосвященнейшего Серафима, Митрополита Берлинского и Германского // «Православная Русь». — 1947. — № 14. — С. 14
Кончина митрополита Серафима // «Православная Русь». — 1950. — № 18. — С. 4
Протопресвитер Георгий Граббе Фантастическая история. Гитлер и РПЦЗ (1955) // Собрание сочинений, т.2, Монреаль 1970, стр. 161—172.
К 40-летию кончины митрополита Серафими (Ляде). Правда и ложь // «Вестник Германской епархии РПЦЗ». — 1990. — № 6. — С. 19-25
А. А. Кострюков. Русская Зарубежная Церковь в 1939—1964 гг. Административное устройство и отношения с Церковью в Отечестве. — Москва: Издательство ПСТГУ, 2015.
Лавринов В., прот. Обновленческий раскол в портретах его деятелей. — М.: Общество любителей церковной истории, 2016. — 736 с. — (Материалы по истории Церкви. Кн. 54). — .

1883 births
1950 deaths
Bishops of the Russian Orthodox Church Outside of Russia